Maidana may refer to:

 Cristian Maidana, Argentine footballer
 Jonathan Maidana, Argentine footballer
 Julián Edgardo Maidana, Argentine footballer
 Marcos René Maidana, Argentine professional boxer
 Ruben Maidana, Argentine Olympian
 Roberto Maidana, Argentine journalist
 Maidana (moth), synonym of a genus of moths